Humpata is a town and municipality in the province of Huíla, Angola. The municipality had a population of 89,144 in 2014.

Humpata was the primary destination of the Trekboers on the Dorsland Trek in the 1870s. These Afrikaners formed the majority population in the area for some time, before leaving to South West Africa after World War I, though some stayed until 1975, on the onset of the Angolan Civil War.

See also
 Voortrekkers
 Dorsland Trek
 History of Angola
 Trekboers

References

Populated places in Huíla Province
Municipalities of Angola
Great Trek